Eugene Earle van Tamelen (July 20, 1925 – December 12, 2009) was an organic chemist who is  especially recognized for his contributions to bioorganic chemistry.

van Tamelen published five papers while an undergraduate at Hope College. He conducted graduate work at Harvard University, receiving his doctorate in 1950 with Gilbert Stork as his advisor. He began his academic career at the University of Wisconsin, later joining the faculty of Stanford University, where he spent the majority of his career. Among his many students was Nobelist K. Barry Sharpless.

He led a team who were the first persons to achieve the total synthesis of yohimbine.  He pioneered in what is today called biomimetic synthesis. He was the first to identify squalene oxide as a precursor in the biosynthesis of cholesterol. Van Tamelen was also the first to synthesise Dewar benzene.  He developed a system for nitrogen fixation using titanocene.

van Tamelen was also the owner of the first Marshall Erdman-built Frank Lloyd Wright-designed pre-fabricated house, commonly known as the "Eugene van Tamelen House".

In 1981, van Tamelen became a founding member of the World Cultural Council.

Eugene van Tamelen died of cancer in 2009.

Awards
Among his awards, he received the ACS Award in Pure Chemistry in 1961 and was elected to the US National Academy of Sciences.

References

1925 births
2009 deaths
People from Zeeland, Michigan
Hope College alumni
Harvard University alumni
American people of Dutch descent
20th-century American chemists
Stanford University Department of Chemistry faculty
Deaths from cancer
Members of the United States National Academy of Sciences
Founding members of the World Cultural Council